Jeseník nad Odrou (until 1946 Německý Jeseník) is a municipality and village in Nový Jičín District in the Moravian-Silesian Region of the Czech Republic. It has about 1,900 inhabitants.

Administrative parts
Villages of Blahutovice, Hrabětice, Hůrka and Polouvsí are administrative parts of Jeseník nad Odrou.

Geography
Jeseník nad Odrou is located on the right bank of the Oder River. Most of the municipality lies in the Moravian Gate, the southeastern part with the village of Hůrka lies in the Moravian-Silesian Foothills. There are several ponds in the municipality.

History

The first written mention of the villages of Jeseník nad Odrou and Hůrka comes from 1383. The first mention of Polouvsí is from 1412 and of Blahutovice from 1499. Hrabětice was founded between 1772 and 1776.

During March 1938 four of the five villages that now form the municipality were occupied and annexed by Nazi Germany, becoming an integral part of the Third Reich. The rest of Czech lands were occupied the year after, forming the Protectorate of Bohemia and Moravia in 1939. This protectorate included also the last part of the municipality, the Hůrka village. Jewish population of the municipality fled or was killed during the Holocaust, while the German population was expelled after World War II.

Jeseník nad Odrou and Hrabětice were merged into one municipality in 1957. Polouvsí was joined in 1975 and Blahutovice with Hůrka in 1976.

On the night of 24–25 June 2009, the village was hit by a sudden flood caused by a consecutive series of violent cloudbursts. Three people were killed and it caused extensive damage. Jeseník nad Odrou was the area in the Czech Republic most affected by these floods.

Sights
The late Baroque castle dates from 1728. Today it is privately owned and inaccessible. The castle is surrounded by a small English-style park.

The parish Church of the Assumption of the Virgin Mary was built in 1752. It replaced an old wooden church, destroyed by the fire in 1710.

There are six springs in the area that provide drinkable mineral water with high iron content. They were discovered in the mid-19th century. Two of the springs are freely accessible.

References

External links

Villages in Nový Jičín District